The Interior Salish languages are one of the two main branches of the Salishan language family, the other being Coast Salish. It can be further divided into Northern and Southern subbranches. The first Salishan people encountered by American explorers were the Flathead people (Selish or seliš), among the most easternly of the group.

Languages

 Northern
Shuswap (also known as Secwepemctsín, səxwəpməxcín)
Lillooet (also known as Lillooet, Sttt'tcets, St'át'imcets)
Thompson River Salish (also known as Nlakaʼpamux, Ntlakapmuk, nɬeʔkepmxcín, Thompson River, Thompson Salish, Thompson, known in frontier
 Southern
Coeur d’Alene (also known as Snchitsuʼumshtsn, snčícuʔumšcn)
Columbia-Moses (also known as Columbia, Nxaʔamxcín)
Colville-Okanagan (also known as Okanagan, Nxsəlxcin, Nsilxcín, Nsíylxcən, ta nukunaqínxcən)
Montana Salish (Spokane-Kalispel-Flathead, Kalispel–Pend d'Oreille language, Spokane–Kalispel–Bitterroot Salish–Upper Pend d'Oreille)

The Southern Interior Salish languages share many common phonemic values but are separated by both vowel and consonant shifts (for example k k̓ x > č č' š).

Peoples speaking an Interior Salish language

Northern
Secwepemc, also known as Shuswap, Secwepemctsín, səxwəpməxcín (ʃəxwəpməxtʃín)
St̓át̓imc, also known as Lillooet, Stlʼatlʼimx, Stlʼatlʼimc, Sƛ’aƛ’imxǝc (St̓át̓imcets, also known as Úcwalmicwts)
Nlaka'pamux, also known as Thompson River Salish, Ntlakapmuk, Ntleʼkepmxcín, Thompson River, Thompson Salish, Thompson, known in frontier times as the Hakamaugh, Klackarpun, Couteau or Knife Indians

Central
Colville, Sinixt (Senjextee, Sin Aikst, or Lakes Band), Sanpoil, Okanagan, and Methow, all of whom speak Nxsəlxcin.

Eastern
Spokane, Kalispel, and the Flathead, including the Bitterroot, all of whom speak Montana Salish.

Southern
Sinkiuse-Columbia, Entiat, Wenatchi, and Chelan, all of whom speak Columbia-Moses, also known as Nxaảmxcín, Sinkiuse-Columbia, Sinkiuse, Columbia.
Coeur d'Alene people, also known as Schitsu'umsh or Skitswish (Coeur d'Alene language).

Western
Coastal Salish has been given is own section at Coast_Salish which has been divided farther into 30+ other Salishan speaking populations of the PNW.

Many speakers and students of these languages live near the city of Spokane and for the past three years have gathered at the Celebrating Salish Conference which is hosted by the Kalispel Tribe at the Northern Quest Resort & Casino.

See also
Coast Salish languages

References

Further reading

 Flucke, A. F. Interior Salish. 1952.
 Hanna, Darwin, and Mamie Henry. Our Tellings: Interior Salish Stories of the Nlhaʼkapmx People. Vancouver: UBC Press, 1995. 
 Orser, Brenda I. L. Stem-Initial Pharyngeal Resonants [Symbol for Central Pharyngeal Fricative, Followed by Symbol for Labialized Central Pharyngeal Fricative], in Spokane, Interior Salish. Ottawa: National Library of Canada = Bibliothèque nationale du Canada, 1993.
 Pickford, Arthur E. Interior Salish. British Columbia heritage series, v. 3. Victoria, [B.C.]: Province of British Columbia, Dept. of Education, Division of Curriculum, 1971.

External links
Celebrating Salish Conference
Celebrating Salish Blog
Inlander Article for Celebrating Salish

 
Salishan languages
Indigenous languages of Washington (state)
Indigenous languages of the North American Plateau